The BeoSound 2 is a digital audio player supplied by Bang & Olufsen. It plays MP3- and WMA-format audio stored on Secure Digital or MMC media. The device is finished in polished stainless steel.

BeoSound 2 was designed by the British designer David Lewis and has been on the market since 2002. The A8 Earphones come as standard accessories to use with BeoSound 2.

References

External links
 Official BeoSound 2 site
 Detailed description of the BeoSound 2

Bang & Olufsen
Digital audio players